Mantu may refer to

 Manti (food) popular in most Turkic cuisines
 Mantu Sen (1923–1990), Indian cricketer
 Lucia Mantu (pen name of Camelia Nădejde; 1888–1971), Romanian writer
 Manțu, a Romanian village in Tătărăni commune

See also
 Mantou, a Chinese steamed bun